Palazzo Corvaja (sometimes spelt Palazzo Corvaia) is a medieval palace in Taormina, Sicily, Italy. It was principally built at the end of the 14th century and is named after one of the oldest and most famous families of Taormina, which owned it from 1538 to 1945. 

On four main floors and constructed around a courtyard, the Catalan Gothic palazzo is crenellated.  The principal floor has fenestration of pairs of lancet windows divided by columns.  The courtyard walls are decorated by reliefs illustrating The Creation.

Today the palazzo is used as an exhibition centre.

History 

Corvaja Palace, which is located in Piazza Badia at right angles to the church of Saint Catherine of Alexandria, The origins of the palazzo incorporate an early Norman fortress dating from the 12th-14th century, which in turn was constructed on Roman foundations. It was subsequently added to over various periods up until the 15th century. Its main body is an Norman-style tower, and it has an inner courtyard where the Gothic influence can be seen in the arched windows and doorways. A 13th century staircase leads up to the first floor and an ornamental balcony which overlooks the courtyard.

In 1410, Corvaja Palace housed the Sicilian Parliament.<ref>Taormina in Tasca, by Dario Flaccovio Editore, p. 50</ref> It was renovated in 1945 by Armando Dillo, and as of 2009 it is the seat for the Azienda Autonoma Soggiorno e Turismo.

 References 

Sources
 Taormina in Tasca'', published by Dario Flaccovio Editore, June 2003

External links 
 Image of Palazzo Corvaja

Buildings and structures completed in the 10th century
Corvaia
Taormina
Buildings and structures completed in the 14th century
Medieval Italian architecture
14th-century establishments in Italy
10th-century establishments in Italy